The Doug Wright Awards for Canadian Cartooning (established in December 2004) are literary awards handed out annually since 2005 during the Toronto Comic Arts Festival to Canadian cartoonists honouring excellence in comics (including webcomics) and graphic novels published in English (including translated works). The awards are named in honour of Canadian cartoonist Doug Wright. Winners are selected by a jury of Canadians who have made significant contributions to national culture, based on shortlisted selections provided by a nominating committee of five experts in the comics field.  The Wrights are handed out in three main categories, "Best Book", "The Spotlight Award" (affectionately known as "The Nipper"), and, since 2008, the "Pigskin Peters Award" for non-narrative or experimental works. In 2020, the organizers added "The Egghead", an award for best kids’ book for readers under twelve. In addition to the awards, since 2005 the organizers annually induct at least one cartoonist into the Giants of the North: The Canadian Cartoonist Hall Fame.

The Wright Awards are modeled after traditional book prizes, with the intention of drawing attention to the comics medium from a broad range of demographics inside and outside of its traditional fanbase. The Wrights have garnered acclaim as well as earning the support of a diverse range of participating artists and jurors including Scott Thompson, Don McKellar, Bruce McDonald, Jerry Ciccoritti, Bob Rae, Andrew Coyne, Sara Quin, Greg Morrison, Chester Brown, Lorenz Peter, and Nora Young.

Awards

The Best Book and The Spotlight awards are a large wood-and-glass trophies which are engraved with images from Wright's comic strip (the one difference being the images that are etched on the glass). The award was designed by the cartoonist Seth, who admitted to some embarrassment at being the inaugural winner of the trophy he designed. The Pigskin Peters Award, named in honour of a character from Jimmy Frise's Birdseye Center, is a custom, tailored derby hat with its own unique plaque that doubles as a hat post. It was also designed by Seth.

Each recipient of a Doug Wright Award also receives a custom-bound copy of their winning work.

Nominees 

Winners are indicated by ***.

2005

(Jurists: Chester Brown, Rebecca Caldwell, Nora Young, Jerry Ciccoritti and Don McKellar)

Best Book 

 Worn Tuff Elbow #1 by Marc Bell (Fantagraphics Books)
 Pamplemoussi by Geneviève Castrée (L'Oie de Cravan)
 The Frank Ritza Papers by David Collier (Drawn & Quarterly)
 DC: The New Frontier vol. 1 by Darwyn Cooke (DC Comics)
 Clyde Fans, Book One by Seth (D&Q) ***

Best Emerging Talent 

 Rabbithead by Rebecca Dart (Alternative Comics)
 Revolver #1 by Max Douglas / Salgood Sam (self-published)
 Canvas by Alex Fellows (Fantagraphics)
 Scott Pilgrim's Precious Little Life by Bryan Lee O'Malley (Oni Press) ***

2006

(Jurists: Justin Peroff, Alan Hunt and Ben Portis)

Best Book 

 Pyongyang: A Journey in North Korea by Guy Delisle (D&Q)
 Scott Pilgrim Versus the World by Bryan Lee O’Malley (Oni)
 Dragonslippers: This Is What an Abusive Relationship Looks Like by Rosalind B. Penfold (Grove Press)
 Paul Moves Out by Michel Rabagliati (D&Q) ***
 Wimbledon Green by Seth (D&Q)

Best Emerging Talent 

 Northwest Passage Vol. 1 by Scott Chantler (Oni)
 The Unexpurgated Tale of Lordie Jones by Marc Ngui (Conundrum Press)
 Dark Adaptation by Lorenz Peter ***
 Skim by Mariko Tamaki and Jillian Tamaki
 Nil: A Land Beyond Belief by James Turner (Slave Labor Graphics)

2007

(Jurists: Bruce McDonald, Mark Kingwell, Judy MacDonald, Lorenz Peter and Jessica Johnson)

Best Book 

 Shenzen: A Travelogue From China by Guy Delisle (D&Q)
 This Will All End in Tears by Joe Ollmann (Insomniac Press) ***
 Scott Pilgrim & The Infinite Sadness by Bryan Lee O'Malley (Oni)
 Gilded Lilies by Jillian Tamaki (Conundrum Press)
 Nog-a-dod edited by Marc Bell (Conundrum Press)

Best Emerging Talent 

 Gray Horses by Hope Larson (Oni)
 House of Sugar by Rebecca Kraatz (Tulip Tree Press) ***
 Was She Pretty? by Leanne Shapton (Farrar, Straus & Giroux)
 Bacter-area by Keith Jones (D&Q)
 Mendacity by Tamara Berger & Sophie Cossette (Kiss Machine)

2008

(Jurists: Katrina Onstad, Ho Che Anderson, Marc Glassman, Mariko Tamaki and Helena Rickett)

Best Book 

 365 Days: A Diary by Julie Doucet (D&Q)
 Spent by Joe Matt (D&Q)
 The Magical Life of Long Tack Sam by Ann Marie Fleming (Riverhead Books) ***
 Southern Cross by Laurence Hyde (D&Q)

Best Emerging Talent 

 Essex County Vol. 1: Tales from the Farm and Vol. 2: Ghost Stories by Jeff Lemire (Top Shelf Productions) ***
 Pope Hats by Ethan Rilly
 Kieffer #1 by Jason Kieffer
 The Experiment by Nick Maandag

2008 saw the introduction of a new category dedicated to works that fall outside the bounds of traditional storytelling. Named after a character in the classic Canadian comic strip Birdseye Center, the Pigskin Peters Award recognizes experimental and avant-garde comics.

Pigskin Peters Award 

 Milk Teeth by Julie Morstad (D&Q) ***
 Little Lessons in Safety by Emily Holton (Conundrum Press)
 Excelsior 1968 by John Martz (self-published)
 Fire Away by Chris von Szombathy (D&Q)

2009

(Jurists: Bob Rae, Andrew Coyne, Martin Levin, Joe Ollmann and Diana Tamblyn)

Best Book 

 Burma Chronicles by Guy Delisle (D&Q)
 Drop-in by Dave Lapp (Conundrum)
 Paul Goes Fishing by Michel Rabagliati (D&Q)
 Skim by Jillian & Mariko Tamaki (Groundwood) ***

Best Emerging Talent 

 History Comics by Kate Beaton (self-published) ***
 Maids in the Mist by Caitlin Black (self-published)
 Blue Winter, Shapes in the Snow by Jesse Jacobs (self-published)
 Kieffer #2 by Jason Kieffer (self-published)
 Jack & Mandy by Nick Maandag (self-published)

Pigskin Peters Award 

 Hall of Best Knowledge by Ray Fenwick (Fantagraphics)
 Ojingogo by Matthew Forsythe (D&Q) ***
 All We Ever Do is Talk About Wood by Tom Horacek (D&Q)
 Small Victories by Jesse Jacobs (self-published)

Winners of the 2009 Doug Wright Awards were announced on May 9, 2009 at the Art Gallery of Ontario during a ceremony hosted by actor and director Don McKellar.

2010

(Jurists: Matthew Forsythe, Geoff Pevere, Fiona Smyth, and Carl Wilson)

Best Book 

 Back + Forth by Marta Chudolinska (Porcupine's Quill)
 George Sprott: (1894–1975) by Seth (D&Q) ***
 Hot Potatoe by Marc Bell (D&Q)
 Kaspar by Diane Obomsawin (D&Q)
 Red: A Haida Manga by Michael Nicoll Yahgulanaas (D&Q)

Best Emerging Talent 

 I'm Crazy by Adam Bourret
 Lose #1, Cold Heat Special #7 by Michael DeForge (Koyama Press; Picturebox) ***
 Nicolas by Pascal Girard (D&Q)
 It's Snowing Outside, We Should Go for a Walk by John Martz
 The Hipless Boy by Sully (Conundrum)

Pigskin Peters Award 

 Bébête by Simon Bossé (L'Oie de Cravan)
 Dirty Dishes by Amy Lockhart (D&Q)
 Hot Potato by Marc Bell (D&Q) ***
 Never Learn Anything from History by Kate Beaton (self-published)
 The Collected Doug Wright Volume One by Doug Wright (D&Q)

Winners of the 2010 Doug Wright Awards were announced on May 8, 2010 in the Bram & Bluma Appel Salon in the Toronto Reference Library, during a ceremony hosted by actor Peter Outerbridge.

2011 

(Jurists: Sara Quin, Michael Redhill, Anita Kunz, Marc Bell and Mark Medley)

Best Book 

 Bigfoot by Pascal Girard (Drawn and Quarterly) ***
 Chimo by David Collier (Conundrum Press)
 Lose #2 by Michael DeForge (Koyama Press)
 Moving Pictures by Kathryn Immonen, Stuart Immonen (Top Shelf Productions)
 Streakers by Nick Maandag

Best Emerging Talent 

 Aaron Costain, Entropy # 5
 Alex Fellows, Spain and Morocco ***
 Keith Jones, Catland Empire (Drawn and Quarterly)
 James Stokoe, Orc Stain Volume One (Image)
 Tin Can Forest (aka Marek Colek and Pat Shewchuk), Baba Yaga and the Wolf (Koyama Press)

Pigskin Peters Award 

 Indoor Voice by Jillian Tamaki (Drawn and Quarterly)
 Stooge Pile by Seth Scriver (Drawn and Quarterly)
 So I've Been Told by Maryanna Hardy (Conundrum Press)
 Spotting Deer by Michael DeForge (Koyama Press) ***
 Wowee Zonk #3 edited by Patrick Kyle, Ginette Lapalme and Chris Kuzma (Koyama Press)

2012

Best Book 

 Hark! A Vagrant by Kate Beaton  (Drawn & Quarterly) ***
 Lose #3 by Michael Deforge (Koyama Press)
 Mid-Life by Joe Ollmann (Conundrum Press)
 Paying for It by Chester Brown (Drawn & Quarterly)
 Reunion by Pascal Girard (Drawn & Quarterly)
 The Great Northern Brotherhood of Canadian Cartoonists by Seth (Drawn & Quarterly)

Spotlight Award (aka The Nipper) 

 Ethan Rilly for Pope Hats #2 (Adhouse Books) ***
 Emily Carroll for "The Seven Windows" (from The Anthology Project vol. 2), "Margot’s Room" and "The Prince & the Sea" (and other comics at emcarroll.com/comic)
 Patrick Kyle for Black Mass # 5 – 6
 Betty Liang for Wet T-Shirt #1, "It’s Only a Secret if You Don’t Tell Anyone" (in š! #9), "Anna Freud’s Recurring Dream" (and other comics at bettyliang.tumblr.com)
 Zach Worton for The Klondike

Pigskin Peters Award 

 Hellberta by Michael Comeau ***
 Hermoddities by Temple Bates
 Pure Pajamas by Marc Bell
 Untitled by Mum Pittsburg, Jupiter Leucetius! Send Us a King. We Are So Bored (and other comics at connorwillumsen.com) by Connor Willumsen

2013

Best Book 

 The Song of Roland by Michel Rabagliati (Conundrum Press) ***
 Lose #4 by Michael DeForge (Koyama Press)
 By This Shall You Know Him by Jesse Jacobs (Koyama Press)
 Pope Hats #3 by Ethan Rilly (AdHouse Books)
 Wax Cross by Tin Can Forest (Koyama Press)

Spotlight Award (aka The Nipper) 

 Nina Bunjevac for Heartless (Conundrum Press) ***
 Brandon Graham for King City (Image Comics)
 Patrick Kyle for Black Mass, Distance Mover, Wowee Zonk #4
 George Walker for The Mysterious Death of Tom Thomson (The Porcupine’s Quill)
 Eric Kostiuk Williams for Hungry Bottom Comics

Pigskin Peters Award 

 Hamilton Illustrated by David Collier (Wolsak & Wynn) ***
 Hellberta #2 and "Sir Softly" from š! #12 by Michael Comeau
 4PANEL comics in Carousel Magazine #28 & #29, by Michael DeForge, Larry Eisenstein, Jesse Jacobs, Mark Laliberte (editor), Marc Ngui, Ethan Rilly, Tin Can Forest and Magda Trzaski
 So, what should we do with ourselves?… from Wowee Zonk #4 and Little Stump in š! #12, by Ginette Lapalme

2014

Best Book 

 Palookaville #21 by Seth (Drawn and Quarterly)
 Paul Joins the Scouts by Michel Rabagliati (Conundrum Press) ***
 Science Fiction by Joe Ollmann (Conundrum Press)
 Susceptible by Geneviève Castrée (Drawn and Quarterly)
 Very Casual by Michael DeForge (Koyama Press)

Spotlight Award 

 Connor Willumsen for "Calgary: Death Milks a Cow", "Treasure Island", "Mooncalf", and "Passionfruit"
 Dakota McFadzean for Other Stories and the Horse You Rode in On (Conundrum Press)
 Patrick Kyle for Distance Mover #7–12, New Comics #1–2
 Steven Gilbert for The Journal of the Main Street Secret Lodge ***
 Georgia Webber for Dumb #1–3

Pigskin Peters Award 

 "Calgary: Death Milks a Cow" by Connor Willumsen
 Flexible Tube with Stink Lines by Seth Scriver
 Journal by Julie Delporte (Koyama Press)
 Out of Skin by Emily Carroll ***
 Very Casual by Michael DeForge (Koyama Press)

2015

Best Book 

 Ant Colony by Michael DeForge (Drawn & Quarterly)
 Fatherland by Nina Bunjevac (Jonathan Cape/Random House) ***
 Safari Honeymoon by Jesse Jacobs (Koyama Press)
 The People Inside by Ray Fawkes (Oni Press)
 This One Summer by Jillian Tamaki and Mariko Tamaki (Groundwood)

Spotlight Award (aka The Nipper) 

 Aaron Costain for Entropy #10
 Elisabeth Belliveau for One Year in America (Conundrum Press)
 Julie Delporte for Everywhere Antennas (Drawn & Quarterly)
 Meags Fitzgerald for Photobooth: A Biography (Conundrum Press) ***
 Simon Roy for Tiger Lung (Dark Horse)
 Sophie Yanow for War of Streets and Houses (Uncivilized Books)

Pigskin Peters Award 

 Comics Collection 2010–2013 and Less than Dust by Julien Ceccaldi
 Great Success! 1983–2013 by Henriette Valium (Crna Hronika)
 New Comics #3–5 by Patrick Kyle (Mother Books)
 Undocumented: The Architecture of Migrant Detention by Tings Chak (The Architecture Observer)
 Swinespritzen by Connor Willumsen ***

2016

Best Book 

 Dressing by Michael DeForge (Koyama Press) ***
 Melody by Sylvie Rancourt (Drawn & Quarterly)
 Palookaville #22 by Seth (Drawn & Quarterly)
 Step Aside, Pops by Kate Beaton (Drawn & Quarterly)
 Stroppy by Marc Bell (Drawn & Quarterly)
 SuperMutant Magic Academy by Jillian Tamaki (Drawn & Quarterly)

Spotlight Award (aka The Nipper) 

 Ted Gudlat for Funny Ha-Has (Roads Publishing)
 Dakota McFadzean for Don’t Get Eaten By Anything (Conundrum Press) ***
 Rebecca Roher for Mom Body (The Nib)
 Sabrina Scott for Witchbody
 Kat Verhoeven for Towerkind (Conundrum Press)

Pigskin Peters Award 

 Leather Vest by Michael Comeau
 New Comics # 6 & 7 by Patrick Kyle ***
 Intelligent Sentient? by Luke Ramsey (Drawn & Quarterly)
 We Are Going To Bremen To Be Musicians by Tin Can Forest and Geoff Berner
 Agalma by Stanley Wany (Éditions Trip)

2017

Best Book 

 Mary Wept Over the Feet of Jesus by Chester Brown (Drawn & Quarterly)
 Big Kids by Michael DeForge (Drawn & Quarterly)
 Burt’s Way Home by John Martz (Koyama Press)
 The Envelope Manufacturer by Chris Oliveros
 Bird in a Cage by Rebecca Roher (Conundrum Press) ***

Spotlight Award (aka The Nipper) 

 Jessica Campbell, Hot or Not: 20th-Century Male Artists (Koyama Press)
 GG, "These Days," "Lapse" (both from š! No. 25 [kuš!]), and an untitled story from Altcomics Magazine 3 (2dcloud)
 Nathan Jurevicius, Birthmark (Koyama Press)
 Laura Ķeniņš, Alien Beings (kuš!)
 Brie Moreno, Dearest, Gift Shop 3D (Oireau), Missy, untitled story from š! No. 6 (kuš!), various web comics
 Steve Wolfhard, Cat Rackham (Koyama Press) ***

Pigskin Peters Award 

 Carpet Sweeper Tales by Julie Doucet (Drawn & Quarterly)
 Draw Blood by Ron Hotz
 Garbage by Matthew Reichertz (Conundrum Press)
 After Land by Chris Taylor (Floating World Comics)
 The Palace of Champions by Henriette Valium (Conundrum Press) ***

2018

Best Book 

 Hostage by Guy Delisle (Drawn & Quarterly)
 I’m Not Here by GG (Koyama Press)
 Crawl Space by Jesse Jacobs (Koyama Press) ***
 The Abominable Mr. Seabrook by Joe Ollmann (Drawn & Quarterly)
 Anti-Gone by Connor Willumsen (Koyama Press)

Spotlight Award (aka The Nipper) 

 Kris Bertin and Alexander Forbes, The Case of the Missing Men (Conundrum Press)
 Gillian Blekkenhorst, All-Inclusive Fully Automated Vacation and House of Strays
 Eric Kostiuk Williams, Condo Heartbreak Disco (Koyama Press)
 Jason Loo, The Pitiful Human-Lizard Nos. 12, 13 and 14 (Chapterhouse Comics)
 Jenn Woodall, Magical Beatdown Vol. 2 and Marie and Worrywart ***

Pigskin Peters Award 

 The Dead Father by Sami Alwani ***
 The Death of the Master by Patrick Kyle
 Crohl’s House Nos. 1 & 2 by Alexander Laird, Jamiel Rahi and Robert Laird
 Creation: The First Three Chapters by Sylvia Nickerson
 Potluck by Wavering Line Collective

See also

Canadian Cartoonist Hall of Fame
Joe Shuster Award

References

External links
Doug Wright Awards homepage
"Doug Wright's family", CBC TV profile of Wright from 1968.
 Artists honoured for comics hailing nostalgia, everyday life

Doug Wright Awards
Doug Wright Awards
Doug Wright Awards
Doug Wright Awards